Burgos is a Spanish surname that originates from the Spanish city of Burgos, the capital of old Castile.

People
 Ambiorix Burgos (born 1984), Major League Baseball player
 Carl Burgos (1918–1984), American comic book and advertising artist
 Dag Burgos (born 1966), Guatemalan Olympic cross-country skier
 Enrique Burgos (baseball, born 1990), Panamanian baseball player
 Francisco de Burgos Mantilla (1612–1672), Spanish painter
 Germán Burgos (born 1969), Argentinian football player
 Javier de Burgos (1778–1848), Spanish writer and politician
 José Burgos (1837–1872), a Spanish-Filipino priest
 Julia de Burgos (1914–1953), Puerto Rican poet and civil-rights activist
 Kike Burgos (born 1971), Spanish football player
 Renata Burgos (born 1982), Brazilian freestyle swimmer
 Ricardo Burgos (born 1965), Guatemalan Olympic cross-country skier
 Shane Burgos, UFC Fighter

References

Spanish-language surnames
Spanish toponymic surnames
Surnames of Puerto Rican origin